Doctor at Large is a 1957 British comedy film directed by Ralph Thomas, the third of the seven films in the Doctor series. It stars Dirk Bogarde, Muriel Pavlow, Donald Sinden and James Robertson Justice. It is based on the 1955 novel of the same title by Richard Gordon.

Main cast

 Dirk Bogarde as Dr. Simon Sparrow
 Muriel Pavlow as Joy Gibson
 Donald Sinden as Benskin
 James Robertson Justice as Sir Lancelot Spratt
 Shirley Eaton as Nurse Nan McPherson
 Derek Farr as Dr. Potter-Shine
 Michael Medwin as Dr. Charles Bingham
 Martin Benson as Maharajah
 John Chandos as O'Malley
 Edward Chapman as Wilkins
 George Coulouris as Pascoe
 Judith Furse as Mrs. Digby
 Gladys Henson as Mrs. Wilkins
 Anne Heywood as Emerald
 Ernest Jay as Charles Hopcroft
 Lionel Jeffries as Dr. Hatchet
 Mervyn Johns as Smith
 Geoffrey Keen as Second Examiner
 Dilys Laye as Mrs. Jasmine Hatchet
 Harry Locke as Porter
 Terence Longdon as George - House Surgeon
 A. E. Matthews as Duke of Skye and Lewes
 Guy Middleton as Major Porter
 Barbara Murray as Kitty
 Dandy Nichols as Lady in Outpatients Dept.
 Nicholas Phipps as Mr. Wayland - Solicitor
 Wensley Pithey as Sam - Poacher
 Maureen Pryor as Mrs. Dalton
 Noel Purcell as "Padre", pub landlord
 George Relph as Dr. Farquarson
 Athene Seyler as Lady Hawkins
 Ronnie Stevens as Waiter at hotel
 Ernest Thesiger as First Examiner
 Michael Trubshawe as Colonel Graves

Plot
Back at St Swithin's, Dr Simon Sparrow loses out to the self-important Dr Bingham for a job as senior house surgeon. Feeling that he has no future as a surgeon, he takes a general practice job in an industrial town. He finds that he has to do most of the work, including night calls, and is also the target of his partner's flirty wife.

He then takes a locum job with Dr Potter-Shine's Harley Street practice, where most of the patients are dotty aristocrats and neurotic society women. Leaving after three months, he moves to a rural practice where patients pay in kind, ranging from home-grown raspberries to poached salmon.

Meanwhile, Tony Benskin fails his finals – again – and travels to Ireland where he buys a very dubious medical degree. This leads to a post as private physician to a rich elderly aristocratic lady in Wiltshire.

Sparrow and Benskin take a short holiday in France, where they save Dr Hopcroft, a governor at St Swithin's, from an embarrassing incident. In return, he arranges for Sparrow and Benskin to return to St Swithin's. Sparrow commences advanced surgical training with Sir Lancelot Spratt, whilst Benskin becomes personal physician to a rich Maharajah.

Reception
The film was the second most popular movie of the year at the British box office, after High Society.

Critical
Variety noted "a blending of light comedy and a dash of sentiment, with punch comedy lines providing timely shots in the arm. They’re welcome when they come, but they’re too irregular," with the reviewer concluding, "Bogarde, of course, is the mainstay of the story, but Justice again emerges as the standout character"; while The New York Times wrote that despite "signs of fatigue," with the film prescribing the same mixture as before, "If it is diluted, it is still not too hard to take."

References

External links

Review of film at Variety
Doctor at Large at Britmovie

1957 films
1957 comedy films
British comedy films
Doctor in the House
1950s English-language films
Films directed by Ralph Thomas
Films shot at Pinewood Studios
Films produced by Betty Box
1950s British films